Rovelli is a surname. Notable people with the surname include:

 Nino Rovelli (1917–1990), Italian bobsledder
 Vittorio Rovelli (born 1916), Italian professional football player
 Carlo Rovelli (born 1956), Italian physicist
 Grant Rovelli (born 1983), Australian rugby league player